Robbert Andringa (born 28 April 1990) is a Dutch professional volleyball player. He is a member of the Netherlands national team. At the professional club level, he plays for Indykpol AZS Olsztyn.

Honours
 National championships
 2014/2015  Belgian SuperCup, with Volley Aalst
 2014/2015  Belgian Cup, with Volley Aalst

References

External links

 
 Player profile at PlusLiga.pl 
 Player profile at Volleybox.net

1990 births
Living people
People from Assen
Sportspeople from Drenthe
Dutch men's volleyball players
Dutch expatriate sportspeople in Belgium
Expatriate volleyball players in Belgium
Dutch expatriate sportspeople in France
Expatriate volleyball players in France
Dutch expatriate sportspeople in Poland
Expatriate volleyball players in Poland
AZS Olsztyn players
Outside hitters
Liberos
21st-century Dutch people